Gurkovo is a village in Balchik Municipality, Dobrich Province, northeastern Bulgaria. Between 1913 and 1940, during the Romanian rule, the village was called Rasoviceni.

References

Villages in Dobrich Province